Newall may refer to:

People 
 Baron Newall, title in the Peerage of the United Kingdom
 Cyril Newall, 1st Baron Newall (1886-1963), British Marshal of the RAF
 Danny Newall, Welsh footballer
 Dennis Newall, Scottish football manager
 Francis Newall, 2nd Baron Newall (born 1930), British businessman and politician
 George Newall, American songwriter
 George E. Newall (died 1919), Michigan politician
 Guy Newall (1885-1937), British actor
 Hugh Newall (1857–1944), British astrophysicist
 Jock Newall (1917-2004), New Zealand international football (soccer) player
 Queenie Newall (1854-1929), British archer
 Robert Stirling Newall (1812-1889), British engineer and astronomer
 Stuart Newall (1843-1919), New Zealand soldier
 Ted Newall (1935-2012), Canadian businessman
 Walter Newall (1780-1863), Scottish architect and civil engineer

Other uses 
 Newall, West Yorkshire, England
 Mount Newall, Antarctica
 Newall Glacier, Antarctica

See also
 Newall Green, an area in Manchester, England
 Newel (disambiguation)
 Newell (disambiguation)
 Newill (surname)